Mally Roncal (born January 8, 1972) is a makeup artist and founder and president of Mally Beauty.

Early life 
Roncal is a second-generation Filipino-American. Roncal credits her stylish mother as the original inspiration for her love of beauty and glamour. Roncal has said of her mother, “She was a doctor and she was always done. Like hair, makeup, heels, nail, clothes, Chanel, the whole thing. She was very particular and I literally remember sitting at her boudoir with her and watching her do her face and she would sort of teach me as she was going along.” Roncal's mother was diagnosed with breast cancer and died in March 1989. Roncal's brand motto that looking good makes people feel good originated from her mother's ordeal.

Education 
Originally a pre-med student in 1995, Roncal prepared for a career in dermatology, before shifting to a degree in fine arts.

Career 
After working for a fashion designer, Roncal began her ten-year freelance career as a makeup artist for celebrities like Beyoncé Knowles and Jennifer Lopez. Roncal served as a spokesperson for Sephora before founding in 2005 Mally Beauty, a line of makeup and cosmetic tools based on her industry experience.

Personal life 
Roncal lives with her husband, photographer Phil Bickett, and their three daughters (twins Pilar and Sophie plus youngest Vivienne).

Mally in popular culture 
Mally Roncal is also known for:
 Her celebrity clients which include: RuPaul, Madonna, Beyoncé, Jennifer Lopez, Mary J. Blige, Hayden Panettiere, Rihanna, Teri Hatcher, Celine Dion, Lee Ann Womack, Ashlee Simpson, Angelina Jolie, Heidi Klum, and Maggie Gyllenhaal
 Mally was featured on Season 13 of The Bachelor when she did Molly Malaney's makeup for her wedding to bachelor, Jason Mesnick
 Mally regularly appears on Wendy Williams Show, The View, The Oprah Winfrey Show, Rachael Ray and Today as a beauty expert and pens editorials for the New York Times, Huffington Post, and iVillage

References

External links 
 Official website

Living people
American make-up artists
1972 births
American people of Filipino descent
American businesspeople